"Yesterday" is a song by the English rock band the Beatles, written by Paul McCartney and credited to Lennon–McCartney. It was first released on the album Help! in August 1965, except in the United States, where it was issued as a single in September. The song reached number one on the US charts. It subsequently appeared on the UK EP Yesterday in March 1966 and made its US album debut on Yesterday and Today, in June 1966.

McCartney's vocal and acoustic guitar, together with a string quartet, essentially made for the first solo performance of the band. It remains popular today and, with more than 2,200 cover versions, is one of the most covered songs in the history of recorded music. "Yesterday" was voted the best song of the 20th century in a 1999 BBC Radio 2 poll of music experts and listeners and was also voted the No. 1 pop song of all time by MTV and Rolling Stone magazine the following year. In 1997, the song was inducted into the Grammy Hall of Fame. Broadcast Music Incorporated (BMI) asserts that it was performed over seven million times in the 20th century.

"Yesterday" is a melancholy ballad about the break-up of a relationship. The singer nostalgically laments for yesterday when he and his love were together, before she left because of something he said. McCartney is the only member of the Beatles to appear on the track. The final recording was so different from other works by the Beatles that the band members vetoed the release of the song as a single in the United Kingdom, although other artists were quick to record versions of it for single release. The Beatles recording was issued as a single there in 1976 and peaked at number 8.

Origin
According to biographers of McCartney and the Beatles, McCartney composed the entire melody in a dream one night in his room at the Wimpole Street home of his then girlfriend Jane Asher and her family. Upon waking, he hurried to a piano and played the tune to avoid forgetting it. Initially concerned though if he had subconsciously plagiarised someone else's work, as he put it: "For about a month I went round to people in the music business and asked them whether they had ever heard it before. Eventually it became like handing something in to the police. I thought if no one claimed it after a few weeks then I could have it."

Upon being convinced that he had not copied the melody, McCartney began writing lyrics to suit it. As Lennon and McCartney were known to do at the time, a substitute working lyric, titled "Scrambled Eggs" (the working opening verse was "Scrambled eggs/Oh my baby how I love your legs/Not as much as I love scrambled eggs"), was used for the song until something more suitable was written.

During the shooting of Help!, a piano was placed on one of the stages where filming was being conducted and McCartney took advantage of this opportunity to tinker with the song. Richard Lester, the director, was eventually greatly annoyed by this and lost his temper, telling McCartney to finish writing the song or he would have the piano removed. The patience of the other Beatles was also tested by McCartney's work in progress; George Harrison summed this up when he said: "Blimey, he's always talking about that song. You'd think he was Beethoven or somebody!"

McCartney originally claimed he had written "Yesterday" during the Beatles' tour of France in 1964; however, the song was not released until the summer of 1965. During the intervening time, the Beatles released two albums, A Hard Day's Night and Beatles for Sale, each of which could have included "Yesterday". Although McCartney has never elaborated on his claims, a delay may have been due to a disagreement between McCartney and George Martin regarding the song's arrangement, or the opinion of the other Beatles who felt it did not suit their image.

Lennon later indicated that the song had been around for a while before:

McCartney said the breakthrough with the lyrics came during a trip to Portugal in May 1965:

On 27 May 1965, McCartney and Asher flew to Lisbon for a holiday in Albufeira, Algarve, and he borrowed an acoustic guitar from Bruce Welch, in whose house they were staying, and completed the work on "Yesterday". The song was offered as a demo to Chris Farlowe before the Beatles recorded it, but he turned it down as he considered it "too soft". In a March 1967 interview with Brian Matthew, McCartney said that Lennon came up with the word that would replace "scrambled eggs": Yesterday.

Resemblance to other songs
In 2001, Ian Hammond speculated that McCartney subconsciously based "Yesterday" on Ray Charles' version of Hoagy Carmichael's "Georgia on My Mind". Hammond concluded his article by saying that, despite the similarities, "Yesterday" is a "completely original and individual [work]".

In July 2003, British musicologists stumbled upon superficial similarities between the lyric and rhyming schemes of "Yesterday" and Frankie Laine's "Answer Me, My Love"; originally a German song by Gerhard Winkler and Fred Rauch called Mütterlein, it was a number 1 hit for Laine on the UK charts in 1953 as "Answer Me, O Lord", leading to speculation that McCartney had been influenced by the song. McCartney's publicists denied any resemblance between "Answer Me, My Love" and "Yesterday".  "Yesterday" begins with the lines: "Yesterday, all my troubles seemed so far away. Now it looks as though they're here to stay." In its second stanza, "Answer Me, My Love" has the lines: "You were mine yesterday. I believed that love was here to stay. Won't you tell me where I've gone astray".

Composition and structure

Ostensibly simple, featuring only McCartney playing an Epiphone Texan steel-string acoustic guitar backed by a string quartet in one of the Beatles' first uses of session musicians, "Yesterday" has two contrasting sections, differing in melody and rhythm, producing a sense of variety and fitting contrast. The main melody is seven bars in length, extremely rare in popular song, while the bridge, or "middle eight", is the more standard form of eight bars; often two four-bar phrases combined.

The first section ("Yesterday, all my troubles seemed so far away ...") opens with an F chord (the 3rd of the chord is omitted), then moving to Em7 before proceeding to A7 and then to D minor. In this sense, the opening chord is a decoy; as musicologist Alan Pollack points out, the home key (F major) has little time to establish itself before "heading towards the relative D minor". He points out that this diversion is a compositional device commonly used by Lennon and McCartney, which he describes as "deferred gratification".

The second section ("Why she had to go I don't know ...") is, according to Pollack, less musically surprising on paper than it sounds. Starting with Em7, the harmonic progression quickly moves through the A major, D minor, and (closer to F major) B, before resolving back to F major, and at the end of this, McCartney holds F while the strings descend to resolve to the home key to introduce the restatement of the first section, before a brief hummed closing phrase.

Pollack described the scoring as "truly inspired", citing it as an example of "[Lennon & McCartney's] flair for creating stylistic hybrids"; in particular, he praises the "ironic tension drawn between the schmaltzy content of what is played by the quartet and the restrained, spare nature of the medium in which it is played".

The tonic key of the song is F major (although, since McCartney tuned his guitar down a whole step, he was playing the chords as if it were in G), where the song begins before veering off into the key of D minor. It is this frequent use of the minor, and the ii–V7 chord progression (Em and A7 chords in this case) leading into it, that gives the song its melancholy aura. The A7 chord is an example of a secondary dominant, specifically a V/vi chord. The G7 chord in the bridge is another secondary dominant, in this case a V/V chord, but rather than resolve it to the expected chord, as with the A7 to Dm in the verse, McCartney instead follows it with the IV chord, a B. This motion creates a descending chromatic line of C–B–B–A to accompany the title lyric.

The string arrangement reinforces the song's air of sadness, in the groaning cello line that connects the two halves of the bridge, notably the "blue" seventh in the second bridge pass (the E played after the vocal line "I don't know / she wouldn't say") and in the descending run by the viola that segues the bridge back into the verses, mimicked by McCartney's vocal on the second pass of the bridge. This viola line, the "blue" cello phrase, the high A sustained by the violin over the final verse and the minimal use of vibrato are elements of the string arrangement attributable to McCartney rather than George Martin.

When the song was performed on The Ed Sullivan Show, it was done in the above-mentioned key of F, with McCartney as the only Beatle to perform, and the studio orchestra providing the string accompaniment. However, all of the Beatles played in a G-major version when the song was included in tours in 1965 and 1966.

When McCartney appeared on The Howard Stern Show, he stated that he owns the original lyrics to "Yesterday" written on the back of an envelope. McCartney later performed the original "Scrambled Eggs" version of the song, plus additional new lyrics, with Jimmy Fallon and the Roots on Late Night with Jimmy Fallon.

When asked whether some of the lyrics from "Yesterday" are a reference to his early loss of his mother, Mary McCartney, he stated that "I didn't mean it to be, but ... it could be".

Recording

The track was recorded at Abbey Road Studios on 14 June 1965, immediately following the taping of "I'm Down", and four days before McCartney's 23rd birthday. There are conflicting accounts of how the song was recorded. Some sources state that McCartney and the other Beatles tried a variety of instruments, including drums and an organ, and that George Martin later persuaded them to allow McCartney to play his Epiphone Texan steel-string acoustic guitar, later overdubbing a string quartet for backup. Regardless, none of the other band members were included in the final recording.

McCartney performed two takes of "Yesterday" on 14 June 1965. Take 2 was deemed better and used as the master take. On 17 June, an additional vocal track by McCartney and a string quartet were overdubbed on take 2 and that version was released.

Take 1, without the string overdub, was later released on the Anthology 2 compilation. On take 1, McCartney can be heard giving chord changes to Harrison before starting, but while Harrison does not appear to actually play, he was most certainly present because his voice is captured on the session tapes. Take 2 had two lines transposed from the first take: "There's a shadow hanging over me"/"I'm not half the man I used to be", though it seems clear that their order in take 2 was the correct one, because McCartney can be heard, in take 1, suppressing a laugh at his mistake.

In 2006, just before the album Love was released, George Martin elaborated on the recording set-up of the song:

The leakage of sound from one track to another caused concern when the surround version of the song was mixed for Love, but it was decided to include the track nevertheless. As Martin explained in the liner notes of Love:
We agonised over the inclusion of "Yesterday" in the show. It is such a famous song, the icon of an era, but had it been heard too much? The story of the addition of the original string quartet is well known, however, few people know how limited the recording was technically, and so the case for not including it was strong, but how could we ignore such a marvellous work? We introduced it with some of Paul's guitar work from "Blackbird", and hearing it now, I know it was right to include it. Its simplicity is so direct; it tugs at the heartstrings.

Release
Concerning the debate on how the song should be released, Martin later said: "['Yesterday'] wasn't really a Beatles record and I discussed this with Brian Epstein: 'You know this is Paul's song ... shall we call it Paul McCartney?' He said 'No, whatever we do we are not splitting up the Beatles.'" Since "Yesterday" was unlike the Beatles' previous work and did not fit in with their image, the Beatles refused to permit the release of a single in the United Kingdom. This did not prevent Matt Monro from recording the first of many cover versions of "Yesterday". His version made it into the top ten in the UK charts soon after its release in the autumn of 1965.

The Beatles' influence over their US record label, Capitol, was not as strong as it was over EMI's Parlophone label in Britain. A single was released in the US, pairing "Yesterday" with "Act Naturally", a track which featured vocals by Starr. The single was released on 13 September 1965 and topped the Billboard Hot 100 chart for four weeks, beginning on 9 October. The song spent a total of 11 weeks on the chart, selling a million copies within five weeks. The single was also number one for three weeks on the US Cash Box pop singles chart the same year.

"Yesterday" was the fifth of six number one Beatles' singles in a row on the American charts, a record at the time. The other singles were "I Feel Fine", "Eight Days a Week", "Ticket to Ride", "Help!" and "We Can Work It Out". On 4 March 1966, the song was issued as the title track of the British EP Yesterday. On 26 March, the EP went to number one, a position it held for two months. Later that year, "Yesterday" was included as the title track of the North American album Yesterday and Today.

"Yesterday" was released on the album A Collection of Beatles Oldies, a compilation album released in the United Kingdom in December 1966, featuring hit singles and other songs issued by the group between 1963 and 1966.

On 8 March 1976, "Yesterday" was released by Parlophone as a single in the UK, featuring "I Should Have Known Better" on the B-side. The single peaked at number 8 on the UK Singles Chart. The release came about due to the expiration of the Beatles' contract with EMI, which allowed the company to repackage the Beatles' recordings as they wished. EMI reissued all 22 of the Beatles' UK singles, plus "Yesterday", on the same day, leading to six of them placing on the UK chart.

In 2006, a version of the song was included on the album Love. The version begins with the acoustic guitar intro from the song "Blackbird" transposed down a whole step to F major from its original key G to transition smoothly into "Yesterday".

Reception and legacy
"Yesterday" is one of the most recorded songs in the history of popular music. Its entry in Guinness World Records states that, by January 1986, 1,600 cover versions had been made. After Muzak switched in the 1990s to programs based on commercial recordings, its inventory grew to include about 500 "Yesterday" covers. In his 1972 article on the development of rock music, Joel Vance of Stereo Review magazine credited the song with originating the vogue for classical and baroque rock, anticipating the Rolling Stones' recording of "As Tears Go By" and works by artists such as the Moody Blues and the Classics IV.

"Yesterday" won the Ivor Novello Award for "Outstanding Song of 1965", and came second in the "Most Performed Work of the Year" category, behind the Lennon–McCartney composition "Michelle". More recently, Rolling Stone ranked "Yesterday" at number 13 on its 2004 list "The 500 Greatest Songs of All Time" and fourth on its 2010 list of "The Beatles' 100 Greatest Songs". In 1999, Broadcast Music Incorporated (BMI) placed "Yesterday" third on its list of songs of the 20th century most performed on American radio and television, with approximately seven million performances. "Yesterday" was surpassed only by the Association's "Never My Love" and the Righteous Brothers' "You've Lost That Lovin' Feelin'". "Yesterday" was voted Best Song of the 20th century in a 1999 BBC Radio 2 poll.

The song was inducted into the Grammy Hall of Fame in 1997. Although it was nominated for Song of the Year at the 1966 Grammy Awards, it lost out to Tony Bennett's "The Shadow of Your Smile". "Yesterday" was nominated for six Grammys in total that year, and "Help!" was also nominated in four categories. After the band had failed to win any of the ten awards, Alan Livingston, the head of Capitol Records, officially protested about the results, saying that "Yesterday" being passed over for the Song of the Year "makes a mockery of the whole event".

Chuck Berry said that "Yesterday" was the song that he wished that he had written. "Yesterday" has also been criticised for being mundane and mawkish. Bob Dylan had a marked dislike for the song, stating that "If you go into the Library of Congress, you can find a lot better than that. There are millions of songs like 'Michelle' and 'Yesterday' written in Tin Pan Alley." Accompanied by Harrison, Dylan recorded his own version of "Yesterday" four years later, but it was never released.

Shortly before his death in 1980, Lennon commented that "Although the lyrics don't resolve into any sense, they're good lines. They certainly work ... but if you read the whole song, it doesn't say anything" and added the song was "beautiful – and I never wished I'd written it". Lennon made reference to "Yesterday" in his song "How Do You Sleep?" on his 1971 album Imagine. The song appears to attack McCartney with the line "The only thing you done was yesterday, but since you've gone you're just another day", a reference to McCartney's recent hit "Another Day".

In 2001, McCartney said that he had asked Yoko Ono to agree to change the writing credit for "Yesterday" from "Lennon/McCartney" to "McCartney/Lennon". He said that Ono refused, which was one of the reasons for their poor relationship at the time.

At the 2006 Grammy Awards, McCartney performed "Yesterday" live as a mash-up with Linkin Park and Jay Z's "Numb/Encore".

In 2012, the BBC reported that "Yesterday" remained the fourth-most-successful song of all time in terms of royalties paid, having amassed a total of £19.5 million in payments.

Personnel
According to Mark Lewisohn and Ian MacDonald:

Paul McCartney – vocal, acoustic guitar
Tony Gilbert – violin
Sidney Sax – violin
Kenneth Essex – viola
Peter Halling/Francisco Gabarró – cello
 George Martin – producer, string arrangement
Norman Smith – engineer

Charts

Weekly charts

Year-end charts

Certifications

Notes

References

Sources

External links

 

1965 songs
1965 singles
1976 singles
The Beatles songs
Capitol Records singles
Parlophone singles
Songs written by Lennon–McCartney
Song recordings produced by George Martin
Songs published by Northern Songs
Billboard Hot 100 number-one singles
Cashbox number-one singles
Number-one singles in Norway
Baroque pop songs
Torch songs
Pop ballads
1960s ballads
Chamber pop songs
Songs about nostalgia
Songs about heartache